Duncan Wilde is an English soccer manager who is currently the manager of Blue Devils FC in League1 Ontario.

Managerial career
On May 15, 2003 at the Canadian Professional Soccer League press conference the Hamilton Thunder announced Wilde as the new head coach for the 2003 season. 
After leading the Thunder to a six-game undefeated streak, Wilde resigned from his post as head coach after a team meeting with Hamilton owner Italo Ferrari on July 22, 2003. For the remainder of the year Wilde ran his summer camps at his Premier Soccer Academy. The following year he signed a contract with the Toronto Lynx of the USL A-League. After failing to qualify for the post season, Wilde resigned as head coach at the conclusion of the season to resume his coaching responsibilities with the Lynx Youth Academy.

On March 30, 2005 the Oakville Soccer Club together with the Oakville-based Premier Soccer Academy, acquired the franchise rights of the Metro Lions and relocated the team to Oakville and renamed the club the Oakville Blue Devils. During the conference Wilde was announced as the team manager for the 2005 season. Under the guidance of Wilde the club won the CSL Cup with a 2-1 victory over Vaughan Shooters, and finished second in the Western Conference. On February 26, 2006 the Toronto Lynx announced the return of Duncan Wilde as head coach for the 2006 USL season. Though the Lynx failed to qualify for the play-offs, Wilde achieved a 10-game team record undefeated streak at home and reached the finals of the Open Canada Cup, but lost the match 2–0 against Ottawa St. Anthony Italia. In 2008 Wilde led the Lynx to the playoffs for the first time since 2000, but unfortunately for the Lynx, the Cleveland Internationals scored a late winner to take the game 2–1, sending the Lynx home early.

After spending 10 years with the Lynx, Wilde rejoined Oakville in 2015. In the 2017 season, he led them to their second League1 Ontario title.

Managerial stats

Honours

Managerial honours
Oakville Blue Devils
CPSL Championship: 1
 2005

References

External links
DUNCAN WILDE ACADEMY DIRECTOR TORONTO LYNX CLUB HEAD COACH

English football managers
Living people
Soccer people from Ontario
Toronto Lynx coaches
USL First Division coaches
Canadian Soccer League (1998–present) managers
Year of birth missing (living people)